Ijanikin is a neighbourhood located in the Oto-Awori district of Ojo, Lagos State, Nigeria

People
Ijanikin is basically occupied by the Aworis since it is believed that they are the first settlers of the town. The town is traditionally ruled by a mornach who is referred to as the Onijanikin of Ijanikin.

Education
Ijanikin is home to several notable educational institutions including the Federal Government College Lagos, Oto/Ijanikin and also the Lagos state government secondary school, Oto/ijanikin

References

Populated places in Lagos State